Coleophora bilineella is a moth of the family Coleophoridae. It is found in southern Europe (south of France, Switzerland and Romania).

The larvae feed on Cistus monspeliensis, Cistus salvifolius, Fumana, Helianthemum canum and Helianthemum hirtum. They create a laterally compressed, composite leaf case, built of 2-3 leaf fragments of a different age. The case is small and the mouth angle is about 45°.

References

bilineella
Moths described in 1855
Moths of Europe